Daydream is the fourth studio album by South Korean boy group Highlight. It was released on March 21, 2022, by Around US Entertainment and distributed by Kakao Entertainment. The album contains ten tracks, with the lead single sharing its name with the album. Three versions were released, titled Before the Dream, In the Dream, and After the Dream.  The album reached number 4 on the Gaon (now Circle) Album Chart.

Background and album 
On March 2, 2022, News1 announced that Highlight would be making a surprise comeback in the same month, ten months after the release of their post-enlistment EP, The Blowing. The news was later confirmed by Around US Entertainment on March 7 to be the group's first full album release following their rebrand to their current name Highlight, and their first full album in five years. Its release date was announced to be on March 21, 2022. The group also released a highlight film to showcase snippets of the ten tracks which were partially co-written by members Lee Gikwang and Son Dongwoon.

Daydream is described to be a "medium tempo pop-dance song with lyrical vocals and a delicately tuned arrangement." The lyrics are a confession of love that speak from the perspective of someone experiencing heartbreak, wanting to stay in their eternal daydream where they remain with their lover. Leader Yoon Dujun added that "[Daydream] goes well with spring. The lyrics are sentimental. It is a hybrid song that fulfills both moods."

Track listing

Charts

References 

2022 albums
Highlight (band) albums